Southern Chakavian or Ikavian Chakavian is a dialect of the Chakavian variety of Croatian. It is spoken in the area south of the Central Chakavian area, in a narrow strip of Dalmatian littoral and the neighbouring islands: outskirts of Split and Zadar; Korčula, Pelješac, Brač, Hvar, Vis and Šolta. It is also present in the Northwestern part of Istria.

The speech of Split originally belonged to this dialect, but under the influence of Shtokavian immigrants and standard Croatian promoted by the state media, a local variant that has lost many of characteristic Chakavian traits developed, even though a part of older population retains Chakavian in their speech.

Much speech in this dialect mixes Chakavian and Shtokavian features. It is assumed that in the past this dialect covered larger territory in the hinterland, being gradually suppressed by constant migrations who carried Shtokavian speech at its cost.

Common Slavic yat phoneme had a reflex of /i/ in this dialect.

Slavomolisano dialect, as well Southwestern Istrian, which are mostly or partly Western Shtokavian ( and ) with Ikavian accent, have a massive Southern Chakavian adstratum.

References
 

Dialects of Serbo-Croatian